FC La Chaux-de-Fonds is a Swiss football club based in La Chaux-de-Fonds. It was founded in 1894 and used to play at the Stade Charrière.

History 

F.C. La Chaux-de-Fonds was founded on July 4, 1894, and won the Swiss first division in the seasons 1954, 1955, 1964. The team's most recent spell in the top division was 1986–87. The team also won the Swiss Cup in the years 1948, 1951, 1954, 1955, 1957 and 1961.

In the 2006–07 season, the team finished 10th in the Challenge League, the top scorer was Sid-Ahmed Bouziane with 15 goals. In the 2007–08 season finished 12th in the Challenge League, the top scorer was Bruno Valente with 16 goals. In the 2008–09 season they finished 12th but were not admitted to the Challenge League and were relegated to 2. Liga.

Current squad

Stadium 

FC La Chaux-de-Fonds's current stadium is the Centre Sportif de la Charrière, situated in La Chaux-de-Fonds.

Honours 
Swiss Championship:
Winners (3): 1953–54, 1954–55, 1963–64
Runners-up (3): 1904–05, 1916–17, 1955–56
Swiss Cup:
Winners (6): 1948, 1951, 1954, 1955, 1957, 1961
Runners-up (1): 1964
2. Liga Interregional Group 2:
Winners (1): 2014–15

Former players

External links 
  

 
Football clubs in Switzerland
Association football clubs established in 1894
La Chaux-de-Fonds
1894 establishments in Switzerland